The 1989 NCAA Division I Field Hockey Championship was the ninth women's collegiate field hockey tournament organized by the National Collegiate Athletic Association, to determine the top college field hockey team in the United States. The North Carolina Tar Heels won their first championship, defeating the Old Dominion Lady Monarchs in the final. The championship rounds were held at Stagg Field in Springfield, Massachusetts.

Bracket

References 

1989
Field Hockey
1989 in women's field hockey
1989 in sports in Massachusetts
Women's sports in Massachusetts
Sports competitions in Springfield, Massachusetts